Michael Longfellow (born January 31, 1994) is an American stand-up comedian, actor, and writer. Longfellow was hired to join the cast of the NBC sketch comedy series Saturday Night Live as a featured player for its 48th season in 2022, making his debut alongside Marcello Hernandez, Molly Kearney, and Devon Walker.

Life and career

Longfellow was born and raised in Phoenix, Arizona. His mother and divorce attorney father later divorced; Longfellow's comedy includes references to the fact that both his parents have remarried often, resulting in a collection of stepparents.

During his first year at Arizona State University, where he earned a BA in English literature, Longfellow started performing stand-up comedy. After his 2016 graduation, he moved to Los Angeles, and started performing in comedy clubs across the country, as well as at the Netflix Is A Joke festival during its "Netflix Introducing..." showcase. He has also appeared on Conan and the NBC reality competition series Bring the Funny, co-hosted by his future SNL colleague, Kenan Thompson.

In 2022, it was announced that Longfellow would be joining the cast of Saturday Night Live (SNL) as a featured player for its 48th season. On October 1, 2022, Longfellow made his SNL debut as a new featured cast member. In his first episode, he appeared on Weekend Update to discuss anti-vaccination relatives and actress Sydney Sweeney’s Trump-supporting family members.

References

External links
 
 

1994 births
21st-century American male actors
21st-century American comedians
American male comedians
American male television actors
American sketch comedians
American stand-up comedians
Arizona State University alumni
Comedians from Arizona
Living people
Writers from Phoenix, Arizona